Ronald Frederick Stitfall (14 December 1925 – 22 June 2008) was a Welsh professional footballer and Wales international. A one club man he played his entire career for his hometown club Cardiff City.

Career
Born in Cardiff, Stitfall was a keen Cardiff City fan, often attending games at Ninian Park before going on to join the club in 1939, making his debut in a wartime friendly at the age of 14 against Swansea Town. He went on to feature in a number of friendlies for the club before serving in the army for four years during World War II. He eventually returned to play for Cardiff in 1947 and made his professional debut for the club in October 1947 when he started a match against Bradford City at left-back in place of Alf Sherwood who was away on international duty for Wales. The match finished 0-0 due to Stitfall making a last minute goal line clearance to save a point for the Bluebirds.

In his first few years at Cardiff he played in numerous positions, including scoring five times during a spell wearing the number nine shirt as a striker during the 1949–50 season. Despite this he went on to score just eight league goals during his entire league career. For more than a decade he formed a formidable full back pairing with another Cardiff City great and Wales international in Alf Sherwood, who eventually left the club in 1955. In total Stitfall played as a professional for Cardiff for eighteen seasons before retiring. During his career at Cardiff he also played alongside his two brothers at the club. Albert Stitfall made a handful of appearances alongside Ron in the first team and Bob Stitfall played as a goalkeeper for the club and, although he never made a professional appearance for the club, he did play alongside his brothers for the reserve side.

During his career Stitfall gained two caps for Wales, making his debut in a 5–2 defeat against England on 12 November 1952 and winning his second cap five years later against Czechoslovakia in May 1957.

After retiring he became a youth coach at Cardiff, including coaching John Toshack who was in the youth system at the time, before joining the training staff at Newport County. He later went on to become kit manager for the Welsh national side.

Honors
Cardiff City

Welsh Cup Winner: 2
 1955-56, 1958-59
Welsh Cup Runner-up: 1
 1959-60

References

1925 births
2008 deaths
Footballers from Cardiff
Cardiff City F.C. players
Welsh footballers
Wales international footballers
English Football League players
British Army personnel of World War II
Association football defenders